The San Francisco Soccer Football League or SFSFL, established in 1902, is "the oldest American soccer league in continuous existence."

The SFSFL is a men's semi-professional and amateur soccer league consisting of teams from San Francisco, California and surrounding cities in the Bay Area.  The SFSFL is affiliated with the United States Adult Soccer Association region IV California Soccer Association-North and regularly sends teams to the National Amateur Cup. SFSFL teams have won the Lamar Hunt U.S. Open Cup four times.

History
Established in 1902 as the California Football Association, the SFSFL is the oldest soccer league continuously operating in the United States, pre-dating even the 1913 foundation of the United States Soccer Federation. The next-oldest U.S. leagues, the Cosmopolitan Soccer League of New York City and the National Soccer League of Chicago, were formed in 1923 and 1938, respectively.  With several community leaders and soccer enthusiasts, alike, they created football (soccer) clubs, such as: Pickwicks, Pastimes, Barbarians, Hornets, Vampires, American Rifles, Independents, Albion Rovers and the Thistles FC. These clubs help lay the foundation for organized adult soccer which led to the inception of the SFSFL. Teams played soccer matches on Sundays, competing with teams as far north as Sacramento when transportation was only by ferry-boat. Over time, the SFSFL helped launch the California Soccer Association and would compete in the first California State Cup in 1904. Dominating the national soccer scene from the earliest days, SFSFL teams have won four Lamar Hunt US Open Cup; numerous state and national titles; to hosting and playing international matches in the historic Kezar Stadium. The SFSFL would be known across the country, producing memorable clubs, players, personalities, all-star games and national champions. SFSFL members have been inducted into both the US Soccer and CSAN Halls of Fame for contributing to the game.

Some of the league's earliest teams still in operation are:
Olympic Club (1916)
SFIAC (1917)
SF Vikings SC (1922)
Club Peru (1926)

Organization
The league currently has three divisions, playing from March through November. Premier Division games are played at Boxer Stadium. Other divisions split games between Crocker Amazon Park, West Sunset, Beach Chalet, and the Polo Fields in Golden Gate Park.

Each team is individually owned and team owners approve new team membership. Annual divisional promotion and relegation occur keeping teams competitive. Division winners are awarded a permanent trophy with teams' names placed on the century-old trophy as well as awarded prize money. Players are granted amateur status preserving NCAA eligibility. Standard FIFA games laws are used.   Teams are allowed 22 roster players of which 17 can play on game day. A three-referee crew are assigned to each match. Elite officials from FIFA to state level travel across California to officiate in the SFSFL.

2018 Team List 

This is a list of the participants in the last season:

Premier Division 
Club Marin
Mexicali
Mezcala SC
Olympic Club
San Francisco Celtic SC
San Francisco City FC
San Francisco Corinthians
San Francisco Glens
San Francisco Hibernian FC
San Francisco Italian Athletic Club
San Francisco Vikings SC
United SC

Majors Division 
San Francisco Metropolitan FC
Azteca FC
Berenice SC
Club Marin Reserves
Deportivo Cometa
FC Dirty Birds
Indy Athletic FC
Innisfree FC
MCFC
Melchester Rovers FC
Oakland Leopards FC
Olympic Club Reserves
San Francisco Battery FC
San Francisco Glens Reserves
Total Football FC

First Division 
The Big Green
DZ United
Juventus F.C.
San Francisco Fog
Sport Alianza FC
Tornado
Sport & Social Club

Champions

Notable Members
Lamar Hunt U.S. Open Cup Champions:
1976 San Francisco Italian Athletic Club
1985 Greek-American AC
1993 El Farolito Soccer Club
1994 Greek-American AC
National Amateur Cup Finalists:
1979 San Francisco Glens
1990 San Francisco Glens
1991 El Farolito Soccer Club
National Soccer Hall of Fame members: 
Matthew Boxer (1961)
Ernie Feibusch (1984)
Stephen Negoesco (2003)

United States men's national soccer team coach Lothar Osiander

United States men's national soccer team capped players:
Alexi Lalas
John Doyle
C.J.Brown
Troy Dayak
Peter Woodring
Christopher Sullivan
Peter Cochran
Alberto Cruz
Major League Soccer players:
John Doyle
Troy Dayak
C.J.Brown
Peter Woodring
 Johnny Moore
Christopher Sullivan
Marquis White

References

External links
 
 Official Twitter

 
Sports competitions in San Francisco
Soccer leagues in the United States
United States Adult Soccer Association leagues
1902 establishments in California
Sports leagues established in 1902
Regional Soccer leagues in the United States